Dynamo Manage is a sports venue in Moscow, Russia that is located near neighboring Dynamo Minor Arena.

References

Sports venues built in the Soviet Union
Sports venues in Moscow
Sports venue